Adam Cox (born 13 November 1986) is a British male artistic gymnast, representing the United Kingdom and Scotland at international competitions. He competed at world championships, including the 2006 World Artistic Gymnastics Championships in Aarhus, Denmark.

References

External links 
 
 
 

1986 births
Living people
Place of birth missing (living people)
British male artistic gymnasts
Scottish gymnasts
Scottish sportsmen
Commonwealth Games silver medallists for Scotland
Commonwealth Games medallists in gymnastics
Gymnasts at the 2006 Commonwealth Games
Gymnasts at the 2014 Commonwealth Games
Medallists at the 2006 Commonwealth Games
Medallists at the 2014 Commonwealth Games